David MacMillan (December 24, 1886 – July 9, 1963) was an American basketball coach. He was a longtime head coach at the University of Minnesota (18 seasons, 1927–42, 1945–48), and briefly coached the NBA's Tri-Cities Blackhawks in 1950, succeeding Red Auerbach.

Before Minnesota, MacMillan was the head coach at the University of Idaho in Moscow, his alma mater. He led the Vandals for seven seasons, from 1920 to 1927, the last six in the Pacific Coast Conference. 
In Idaho's first two seasons in the PCC, his upstart program won consecutive conference titles in 1922  He also coached baseball and freshman football at Idaho, and baseball at Minnesota from 1942 through 1947.

Born in New York City, he attended Oberlin College in Ohio before transferring to the University of Idaho.

MacMillan resigned at Minnesota at age 62 in March 1948, citing health reasons. After his brief stint with the Blackhawks, MacMillan served as an assistant coach of the Minneapolis Lakers under John Kundla, who had been a player and assistant under MacMillan at Minnesota. He died from cancer at age 76 in Minneapolis.

References

External links
 Sports Reference – Dave McMillan – Minnesota (1927–1948)
 Sports Reference – Dave MacMillan – Idaho (1920–1927)
 BasketballReference.com: Dave MacMillan

1886 births
1963 deaths
American men's basketball coaches
Basketball coaches from New York (state)
Idaho Vandals baseball coaches
Idaho Vandals men's basketball coaches
Minneapolis Lakers coaches
Minnesota Golden Gophers baseball coaches
Minnesota Golden Gophers men's basketball coaches
Tri-Cities Blackhawks head coaches
Place of birth missing